Kuekenthal's yellow tiger (Parantica kuekenthali) is a species of nymphalid butterfly in the Danainae subfamily. It is endemic to Indonesia.

References

Sources
 

Parantica
Butterflies of Indonesia
Endemic fauna of Indonesia
Butterflies described in 1896
Taxonomy articles created by Polbot